Ajar or AJAR may refer to:

Places 
 Ajar, Afghanistan
 Ajar, Mauritania

People 
 Ajar people, an ethnographic group of Georgians
 Johnny Ajar
 Émile Ajar

Publications 
 The Australian Journal of Agricultural Research
 The African Journal of AIDS Research, a peer-reviewed medical journal

Other uses 
 AJAR (applications software platform), a Motorola software platform for mobile phones
 Ajar dialect
 Ajar (Gujar)

See also
 Acar (disambiguation)
 Jar (disambiguation)